A brake run on a roller coaster is any section of track meant to slow or stop a roller coaster train. Brake runs may be located anywhere along the circuit of a coaster and may be designed to bring the train to a complete halt or to simply adjust the train's speed. Contrary to some belief, the vast majority of roller coasters do not have any form of braking on the train itself, but rather forms of braking that exist on track sections. One notable exception is the Scenic Railway roller coaster, which relies on an operator to manually control the speed of the train.

On most roller coasters, the brakes are controlled by a computer system. Some older coasters have manually operated friction or skid brakes, some with a pneumatic assist. These are either engaged at the control panel or operated by pulling or pushing large levers in the station.

Types of runs

Trim brakes 

Trim brakes are sections of brakes which are intended to adjust a train's speed during its course rather than bring the train to a complete stop. They may be engineered into a ride at its design stages at certain anticipated troubled spots, or later retrofitted once it is discovered that trains traverse certain areas at higher-than-anticipated speeds. Trim brakes are often either added for safety reasons, to lower g-forces in certain areas, or for maintenance/mechanical reasons, to lower the cost of wear-and-tear damage (especially on wooden roller coasters) caused by the trains traveling at faster than normal speeds. Usually, a proximity sensor precedes the trim brake in order to identify the current speed of the passing train. From this, the trim will then grab the train's brake fins to reduce the train's speed to that set by the control system.

Block brakes 
Block brakes are sections of brakes located on any roller coaster wherever more than one train is intended to run. They act as virtual barriers between the trains running on the roller coaster, preventing collisions should one train stop along the course for any reason. Block brakes must be capable of completely stopping the train (should a vehicle preceding the block stop) and starting a train (after it has been stopped). Block brake sections usually start the train again either by using a slight downward slope to let gravity take its course, or by using drive tires to push the train out of the block. Like trim brakes, block brakes can also be used to control the speed of the train. These are usually known as mid-course brake runs. An example of a mid-course brake run is on Titan at Six Flags Over Texas, which consists of such a brake run (which slows the train down drastically, almost to the point of stopping) due to the severe G-forces in its downward 540-degree helix following the brake run.  Mid-course brake runs give more time for another train to be loaded.

Types of brakes 
Various types of braking exist when dealing with roller coasters, some of which have been recently developed due to technological advancements in design.

Skid brakes 
Skid brakes essentially involve a long piece of material, often ceramic-covered, situated in the middle of the track parallel to the rails. When the brake is engaged, the skid raises and friction against the underside of the train causes the train to slow and eventually stop. Skid brakes were one of the first advancements in roller coaster braking and are typically not utilized in modern creations with the exception of Twister at Knoebels Amusement Resort in Elysburg, PA and the Matterhorn at Disneyland in California.

Fin brakes 
Fin brakes involve a metal fin being attached to the underside of a train. The track is fitted with two computer-controlled squeezing mechanisms which upon closing, squeeze the fin and either slow or stop the train. Fin brakes are the most common form of brakes on roller coasters today. Sometimes they are thick metal box beams (mostly on Bolliger & Mabillard roller coasters); others are thin metal plates. They slide between pairs of friction pads similar to automotive brake pads. Fin brakes are designed to be fail-safe, so that a loss of power will cause them to engage. Brakes are constructed according to a certain measure of redundancy, meaning the ride is usually fitted with one extra set of brakes to bring the train to a hold even if one brake fails. Opening is done by a bellows type of air-operated actuator. Each set of brakes is fitted with its own air supply system controlled by supply valves which open the brake when it is safe to do so. A heavy spring, usually made of steel, is used to hold the brake closed by default.

Magnetic brakes 

Rather than slowing a train via friction (such as fin or skid brakes), which can often be affected by various elements such as rain, magnetic brakes rely completely on certain magnetic properties and resistance. In fact, magnetic brakes never come in contact with the train.

Magnetic brakes are made up of one or two rows of neodymium magnets. When a metal fin (typically copper or a copper/aluminum alloy) passes between the rows of magnets, eddy currents are generated in the fin, which creates a magnetic force opposing the fin's motion. The resultant braking force is directly proportional to the speed at which the fin is moving through the brake element. This very property, however, is also one of magnetic braking's disadvantages in that the eddy force itself can never completely hold a train in ideal condition. It is then often necessary to hold the train in place with an additional set of fin brakes or "kicker wheels" which are simple rubber tires that make contact with the train and effectively park it.

Magnetic brakes can be found in two configurations:
 The brake elements are mounted to the track or alongside the track and the fins are mounted to the underside or sides of the train. This configuration looks similar to frictional fin brakes.
 The fins are mounted to the track and the brake elements are mounted to the underside of the train. This configuration can be found on Intamin's Accelerator Coasters (also known as Rocket Coasters) such as Kingda Ka at Six Flags Great Adventure.

Magnetic brakes are silent and are much smoother than friction brakes, gradually increasing the braking power so that the people on the ride do not experience rapid changes in deceleration. Many modern roller coasters, especially those being manufactured by Intamin, have utilized magnetic braking for several years.  Another major roller coaster designer implementing these brakes is Bolliger & Mabillard in 2004 on their Silver Bullet inverted coaster, making it the first inverted roller coaster to feature magnetic brakes, and again used them on their newer projects, such as Leviathan at Canada's Wonderland.  These later applications have proven effectively comfortable and relevant for these inverted coasters which often give the sense of flight. There also exist third party companies such as Magnetar Technologies Corp. which provide various configurations of the technology to be used to replace and retrofit braking systems on existing roller coasters to increase safety, improve rider comfort, and lower maintenance costs and labor.

A disadvantage of magnetic brakes is that they cannot completely stop a train, and as such cannot be used as block brakes. They also cannot be conventionally disengaged like other types of brakes. Instead, the fins or magnets must be retracted so that the fins no longer pass between the magnets. Accelerator Coasters, for example, have a series of magnetic brake fins located on the launch track. When the train is launched, the brakes are retracted to allow the train to reach its full speed. After the train is launched, the brake fins are raised to safely slow the train down in the event of a rollback. This is currently in place at the Top Thrill Dragster of Cedar Point and Kingda Ka of Six Flags Great Adventure, where magnets on the track lower during launch and raise to slow the train in such event.

References 

Roller coaster elements
Brakes
Vehicle braking technologies